The 1985–86 Scottish Cup was the 101st staging of Scotland's most prestigious football knockout competition. The Cup was won by Aberdeen who defeated Heart of Midlothian (Hearts) in the final.

First round

Replay

Second round

Replays

Third round

Replays

Second Replay

Fourth round

Replays

Quarter-finals

Replay

Semi-finals

Final

See also
1985–86 in Scottish football
1985–86 Scottish League Cup

Scottish Cup seasons
Scottish Cup, 1985-86
Scot